Chittorgarh Lok Sabha constituency is one of the 25 Lok Sabha (Parliamentary) constituencies in Rajasthan state in India.

Assembly segments
Presently, Chittorgarh Lok Sabha constituency comprises eight Vidhan Sabha (legislative assembly) segments. These are:

Members of Parliament
1952: U. M. Trivedi, Bharatiya Jana Sangh
1957: Manikya Lal Verma, Indian National Congress
1962: Manikya Lal Varma, Indian National Congress
1967: Onkar Lal Bohra, Indian National Congress
1971: Bishwanath Jhunjhunwala, Bharatiya Jana Sangh
1977: Shyam Sunder Somani, Bharatiya Lok Dal
1980: Nirmla Kumari Shaktawat, Indian National Congress (Indira)
1984: Nirmla Kumari Shaktawat, Indian National Congress
1989: Mahendra Singh Mewar, Bharatiya Janata Party
1991: Jaswant Singh, Bharatiya Janata Party
1996: Jaswant Singh, Bharatiya Janata Party
1998: Udai Lal Anjana, Indian National Congress
1999: Shrichand Kriplani, Bharatiya Janata Party
2004: Shrichand Kriplani, Bharatiya Janata Party
2009: Girija Vyas, Indian National Congress
2014: Chandra Prakash Joshi, Bharatiya Janata Party
2019: Chandra Prakash Joshi, Bharatiya Janata Party

Election Results

See also
 Chittorgarh district
 List of Constituencies of the Lok Sabha

Notes

Chittorgarh district
Lok Sabha constituencies in Rajasthan